Bintulu Hospital is the fourth largest hospital in the state of Sarawak, Malaysia.

Background
Bintulu Hospital is developed on 21 May 2000 and has been initiated to meet the needs of the growing population and also to reduce the influx of patients in Bintulu.

Facilities
Bintulu Hospital is equipped with a fully computerized system namely Hospital Information System (HIS). HIS is a comprehensive integrated information system designed to manage the administrative, financial and clinical aspects of the hospital.  Bintulu Hospital is one of the three public hospitals in Malaysia selected to fully implement this system.

Bintulu Hospital offers a wide range of medical treatments, from general treatments to specialists, which include obstetrics & gynecology, orthopedics, ophthalmology, surgery and pediatric services.

References

Bintulu District
Hospitals in Sarawak
Hospital buildings completed in 2000
Teaching hospitals in Malaysia
20th-century architecture in Malaysia